The United States women's national handball team is the national team of the United States. It takes part in international handball competitions. 

At the 1982 World Women's Handball Championship in Hungary the U.S. team placed 11th. They also participated in the 1975, 1986, 1993 and 1995 IHF World Women's Handball Championship and the 1984, 1988, 1992 and 1996 Olympics.

Results

Olympic Games

Since their first appearance in 1984, the U.S. has participated in four Olympic Games.

World Championship
Since their first appearance in 1975, the U.S. has participated in five World Championships.

Pan American Championships
From their first appearance in 1986 to their last in 2017, the U.S. participated in eight Pan American Championships.

Pan American Games

Since their first appearance in 1987, the U.S. has participated in six Pan American Games.

Nor.Ca. Handball Championship

See also
Handball in the United States
United States men's national handball team

References

External links

IHF profile

Handball
Women's national handball teams
National team